Josip Butić (born 12 December 1974) is a Croatian professional football manager and former player. He was the manager of Croatian club HNK Zadar.

Playing career
During his professional career he mainly played for Zadar, while also spending one season with Segesta and two seasons with Rijeka, as well as a short spell in China.

Managerial career
Butić resigned at HV Posedarje in October 2022 after leading them for a second time. He had succeeded Hari Vukas as manager of Dugopolje in between.

Honours
Zadar
1. B HNL: 1995–96
Croatian Second League: 2000–01, 2006–07

Rijeka
Croatian Cup: 2005

References

1974 births
Living people
Sportspeople from Zadar
Association football midfielders
Croatian footballers
NK Zadar players
HNK Segesta players
HNK Rijeka players
Croatian Football League players
Croatian expatriate footballers
Expatriate footballers in China
Croatian expatriate sportspeople in China
Croatian football managers
NK Zadar managers
NK Dugopolje managers